Fusarium oxysporum f.sp. carthami is a fungal plant pathogen.

References

External links
 USDA ARS Fungal Database

oxysporum f.sp. carthami
Fungal plant pathogens and diseases
Forma specialis taxa
Fungi described in 1963